TELUS Garden is a 1,000,000 square foot office mixed-use redevelopment, located in Vancouver, BC, Canada. The two buildings incorporate office, retail and residential space. Of the 488,000 square feet of office space, approximately 212,000 square feet will be for Telus.

Ownership
In August 2018, TELUS and Westbank (the joint building owners) announced the building's sale to an unnamed party. TELUS will continue to lease space in the building for its head office.

Building details
Square footage of:
The entire project: 1,000,000 square feet
The office space (LEED Platinum): 488,000 square feet of office and retail space (457,000 office/31,000 retail)
The residential space (LEED Gold): 450,000 square feet of residential space
The retail space (LEED Platinum): 40,000 square feet of retail space (approximately 500,000 total)
Number of storeys: 54 floors of residential space and 24 floors of office space
Number of residential units: 428

See also
List of tallest buildings in Vancouver

References

 Globe and Mail. Bike to work? These property owners want you June 30, 2014
 Vancouver Sun. Commercial real estate: Vancouver a world-class hub for visual effects June 10, 2014
 VancityBuzz. Telus Garden office tower boasts street overlapping 'protruding box' architectural features March 2014
 Vancouver is Awesome. @TELUS Garden: The most central, walkable address in the city July 11, 2013
 VancityBuzz. Telus Garden to bring pedestrianized laneways to Vancouver June 2013
 Vancouver is Awesome. A look inside @TELUS Garden Part 2: The power of web sites used to heat buildings. Seriously. June 25, 2013
 Vancouver is Awesome. A look inside @TELUS Garden Part 1: A New Downtown Shortcut! June 11, 2013
 Vancouver is Awesome. Random Act of Awesomeness: Telus Garden’s demolition with a heart! April 27, 2012
 Vancouver is Awesome. Building Blocks: TELUS Garden April 4, 2012

External links
 Telus Garden

Telus
Buildings and structures in Vancouver
Bjarke Ingels buildings
Skyscrapers in Vancouver
Twisted buildings and structures
Residential skyscrapers in Canada
Structural system
Skyscraper office buildings in Canada
Retail buildings in Canada